Dicaelindus is a genus of beetles in the family Carabidae, containing the following species:

 Dicaelindus collinus Andrewes, 1931 
 Dicaelindus feldspathicus W.S.Macleay, 1825 
 Dicaelindus impunctatus (Bates, 1886) 
 Dicaelindus laevis Straneo, 1992 
 Dicaelindus laticollis Straneo, 1992 
 Dicaelindus longimalis Andrewes, 1937 
 Dicaelindus marginatus Straneo, 1972 
 Dicaelindus nitescens (Tschitscherine, 1900) 
 Dicaelindus omestes Andrewes, 1933  
 Dicaelindus pernitidus (Chaudoir in Oberthur, 1883) 
 Dicaelindus ryukyuensis Habu, 1978

References

Licininae